Old Town Farm is a historic poor farm building in Methuen, Massachusetts.  The brick two story building was built in 1846, after Methuen lost its earlier poor farm due to the loss of part of its territory to newly founded Lawrence.  The building is five bays wide and deep, with entries on the front and side; the front entrance is recessed with a fanlight and sidelights.  The building has shed dormers that run much of the length of the roofline, and its end walls are topped by parapets and double chimneys, features not seen elsewhere in the town.

The house was listed on the National Register of Historic Places in 1984; it is now a private residence.

See also
 National Register of Historic Places listings in Methuen, Massachusetts
 National Register of Historic Places listings in Essex County, Massachusetts

References

Farms on the National Register of Historic Places in Massachusetts
Buildings and structures in Methuen, Massachusetts
National Register of Historic Places in Methuen, Massachusetts